
Wejherowo County is a unit of territorial administration and local government (powiat) in Pomeranian Voivodeship, northern Poland, on the Baltic coast. It came into being on January 1, 1999, as a result of the Polish local government reforms passed in 1998. Rumia, Reda and Wejherowo are contiguous, and are referred to as the Kashubian Tricity, an allusion to the larger Tricity area centred on Gdańsk.

As of 2019 its total population is 216,764, out of which the population of Wejherowo is 49,652, that of Rumia is 49,160, that of Reda is 26,011, and the rural population is 91,941.

Wejherowo County on a map of the counties of Pomeranian Voivodeship

Wejherowo County is bordered by Puck County to the north-east, the city of Gdynia to the east, Kartuzy County to the south and Lębork County to the west. It also borders the Baltic Sea to the north.

Location 
According to data from January 1, 2012, the county's area was 1228.25 km2

The neighboring counties are: Kartuzy County, Lębork County, Puck County and city with county rights Gdynia.

Administrative division 
The county is subdivided into 10 gminas (three urban and seven rural). These are listed in the following table, in descending order of population.

References

 
Wejherowo